WWE Free for All is a professional wrestling television program produced by WWE. It serves as a thirty-minute preview show to the promotion's monthly events on pay-per-view, and as such airs freely on PPV channels a half-hour before the actual pay-per-view event starts. Formerly produced under the World Wrestling Federation (WWF) banner, the original format of Free For All also featured exclusive matches in addition to the promotional content that remains in its current format, designed to give prospective viewers a last chance to order the event.

The Free For All name was discontinued in the United States in 2009. Free For All also airs in Australia, and the United Kingdom on Sky UK's Sky Box Office. It also airs on Sky Italia's Sky Sport 2 in Italy 30 minutes before every PPV event shown on Sky Primafila.

History
The first Free For All was broadcast on January 21, 1996 as the pre-show to the 1996 Royal Rumble. The show was hosted by Todd Pettengill and, besides hyping the Royal Rumble, featured a match between Duke Droese and Hunter Hearst Helmsley with the winner becoming the 30th entrant into the Rumble and the loser becoming the 1st entrant.  The last Free For All match was broadcast on July 6, 1997 as the pre-show to In Your House 16: Canadian Stampede and featured The Godwinns defeating The New Blackjacks.

The show was originally simulcast on the Prevue Channel. The original format was changed in 1998 with the United States premiere of Heat, a weekly show on the USA Network featuring live matches, which also served as the countdown show to PPV events on the weeks when the promotion had scheduled pay-per-view events. Beginning with SummerSlam 1998, Free For All became exclusively a preview show featuring promotional material such as pre-match interviews and video summaries on the events that led up to the matches on the pay-per-view. Occasionally, Free For All was replaced with special shows for major PPV events. For WrestleMania 2000, Free For All was replaced with an eight-hour-long show entitled WrestleMania All Day Long, which was only available as part of a purchase option for WrestleMania 2000.

Following No Way Out 2009, the Free For All name was discontinued in the United States and was eventually replaced with WWE Kickoff, which is available on the WWE Network and WWE's official YouTube channel with one or two exclusive matches or in ring segments. Free For All continues to air in Australia, United Kingdom, and in Italy but without the exclusive matches and in ring segments.

Free For All exclusive matches
Royal Rumble 1996, January 21, 1996
 Duke Droese defeated Hunter Hearst Helmsley by disqualification (6:25)
In Your House 6, February 18, 1996
 Jake Roberts defeated Tatanka (with Ted DiBiase) (5:36)
WrestleMania XII, March 31, 1996
 The Bodydonnas (Skip and Zip) (with Sunny) defeated The Godwinns (Henry O. Godwinn and Phineas I. Godwinn) (with Hillbilly Jim) to win the vacant WWF Tag Team Championship (5:21)
 "The Huckster" vs "The Nacho Man" (with special guest referee "Billionaire Ted") ended in a draw
In Your House 7: Good Friends, Better Enemies, April 28, 1996
 Marc Mero (with Sable) defeated The 1-2-3 Kid (with Ted DiBiase) by disqualification (7:17)
In Your House 8: Beware of Dog, May 26, 1996
 The Smokin' Gunns (Billy Gunn and Bart Gunn) defeated The Godwinns (Henry O. Godwinn and Phineas I. Godwinn) (with Hillbilly Jim and Sunny) to win the WWF Tag Team Championship (4:57)
King of the Ring 1996, June 23, 1996
 The Bodydonnas (Skip and Zip) (with Cloudy) defeated The New Rockers (Marty Jannetty and Leif Cassidy) (8:06)
In Your House 9: International Incident, July 21, 1996
 Justin Bradshaw (with Uncle Zebekiah) defeated Savio Vega (4:44)
SummerSlam 1996, August 18, 1996
 Steve Austin defeated Yokozuna (1:52)
In Your House 10: Mind Games, September 22, 1996
 Savio Vega defeated Marty Jannetty (with Leif Cassidy) (5:22)
Survivor Series 1996, November 17, 1996
 (4 on 4) Survivor Series match: Jesse James, Aldo Montoya, Bob Holly, and Bart Gunn defeated The Sultan, Justin Bradshaw, Salvatore Sincere, and Billy Gunn (with The Iron Sheik and Uncle Zebekiah) (10:46)
In Your House 12: It's Time, December 15, 1996
 Rocky Maivia defeated Salvatore Sincere (with Jim Cornette) by disqualification (6:01)
Royal Rumble 1997, January 19, 1997
 Mascarita Sagrada and La Parkita defeated Mini Mankind and Mini Vader (4:29)
WrestleMania 13, March 23, 1997
 Billy Gunn defeated Flash Funk (with Funkette Tracy and Funkette Nadine) (7:05)
In Your House 14: Revenge of the 'Taker, April 20, 1997
 The Sultan (with The Iron Sheik) defeated Flash Funk (2:55)
In Your House 15: A Cold Day in Hell, May 11, 1997
 Rockabilly (with The Honky Tonk Man) defeated Jesse James (3:36)
King of the Ring 1997, June 8, 1997
 The Headbangers (Mosh and Thrasher) defeated Bart Gunn and Jesse James (6:10)
In Your House 16: Canadian Stampede, July 6, 1997
 The Godwinns (Henry O. Godwinn and Phineas I. Godwinn) defeated The New Blackjacks (Blackjack Windham and Blackjack Bradshaw) (5:32)

References

Free for All
American sports television series
1996 American television series debuts